Fremont is a town in Fremont Township, Steuben County, in the U.S. state of Indiana. The population was 2,138 at the 2010 census.

History
Fremont was first settled in 1834 under the name Willow Prairie. It became the Village of Brockville when it was platted in 1837.  In 1848, it was renamed to honor John C. Frémont, "the Great Pathfinder", in part because there was already a Brockville in Indiana.

A post office was established under the name Brockville in 1837, and was renamed to Fremont in 1848. The post office is currently in operation.

In 1914, the first hospital in Steuben County was opened in Fremont by Dr. Wade.

Geography

As an oddity, someone traveling due east from Fremont crosses into Michigan—not into Ohio. This is due to the early 19th century Ohio-Michigan boundary dispute over Toledo (q.v. Toledo War for details).

Demographics

2010 census
As of the census of 2010, there were 2,138 people, 815 households, and 561 families living in the town. The racial makeup of the town was 98.6% White, 0.2% African American, 0.2% Native American, 0.3% Asian, 0.4% from other races, and 0.3% from two or more races. Hispanic or Latino of any race were 1.8% of the population.

There were 815 households, of which 40.4% had children under the age of 18 living with them, 46.1% were married couples living together, 15.3% had a female householder with no husband present, 7.4% had a male householder with no wife present, and 31.2% were non-families. 23.9% of all households were made up of individuals, and 9.5% had someone living alone who was 65 years of age or older. The average household size was 2.62 and the average family size was 3.08.

The median age in the town was 33.1 years. 29.1% of residents were under the age of 18; 9.8% were between the ages of 18 and 24; 28.8% were from 25 to 44; 21.9% were from 45 to 64; and 10.5% were 65 years of age or older. The gender makeup of the town was 48.4% male and 51.6% female.

2000 census
As of the census of 2000, there were 1,696 people, 640 households, and 455 families living in the town. The racial makeup of the town was 98.11% White, 0.18% African American, 0.29% Native American, 0.06% Asian, 0.47% from other races, and 0.88% from two or more races. Hispanic or Latino of any race were 1.95% of the population.

There were 64 households, out of which 4.34% had children under the age of 18 living with them, 508% were married couples living together, 15.2% had a female householder with no husband present, and 2.89% were non-families. 26.1% of all households were made up of individuals, and 11.7% had someone living alone who was 65 years of age or older. The average household size was 2.65 and the average family size was 3.18.

In the town, the population was spread out, with 33.1% under the age of 18, 8.1% from 18 to 24, 29.7% from 25 to 44, 18.3% from 45 to 64, and 10.8% who were 65 years of age or older. The median age was 32 years. For every 100 females, there were 83.0 males. For every 100 females age 18 and over, there were 80.4 males.

The median income for a household in the town was $38,462, and the median income for a family was $42,446. Males had a median income of $31,333 versus $22,260 for females. The per capita income for the town was $16,067. About 5.7% of families and 7.3% of the population were below the poverty line, including 6.6% of those under age 18 and 10.1% of those age 65 or over.

Sites of interest
The following are National Register of Historic Places sites in or near Fremont:
 The Enos Michael House, 200 E. Toledo St, built c. 1850.
 The William L. Lords House, Clear Lake Rd., built c. 1848.
 Pokagon State Park, four miles west of Fremont, is known for recreational activities such as swimming in Lake James, camping and tobogganing in the winter months. In addition to the park itself, the Combination Shelter (known locally as the CCC Shelter) at the park is also on the Register.

Fremont and the surrounding area enjoys several facilities and activities throughout the year:
 Fremont hosts their annual Music Fest each July, which features a parade, live music, games and vendors.
 City Park hosts a farmers' market on Saturday mornings during the summer months.
 Pokagon State Park sponsors a deer hunt in the autumn of most years to help control the population.
 Vistula Park is home to Fremont's little league baseball and softball diamonds. It also has basketball hoops, a pavilion and over a mile of paved walking trails in its woods.
 On Lake George, a former hotel and restaurant, the Lake George Retreat, served a variety of cuisine in a historic setting. The retreat caught fire and burnt to the ground in 2017.

Education
Fremont Community Schools oversees three schools in its district: Fremont High School, Fremont Middle School and Fremont Elementary School. Enrollment in each building ranges between 350 and 400 students annually. Several extracurricular athletic programs are available at the middle and high school levels, including football, basketball, volleyball, wrestling, cross country, track and golf. FHS also fields teams for tennis, baseball and softball.

According to the State of Indiana Department of Education, Fremont Community Schools has been awarded an "A" grade designation for their Exemplary Student Performance for the 2011-2012 School Year.

The town has a lending library, the Fremont Public Library. The library offers a variety of programming for its patrons, including book clubs, classic movie nights, weekly yoga sessions, story time with snacks and crafts, and a new book coffee hour for sharing and discussing the library's newest acquisitions. It also has a local history room.

Manufacturing
Fremont is home to several manufacturing facilities, including Carver Non-woven Technologies LLC, Cold Heading, Swager Communications, New Horizons Baking Company, Health Equipment Mfg., Inc. and Dexter Axle. Among others is Cardinal IG, which came to Fremont in March 1998. Cardinal IG, manufacturers of glass products, have been recognized as a green company, recycling virtually all of the plastic, paper and cardboard used in manufacturing processes.

Downtown Revitalization
In December 2010, Fremont was awarded $500,000 from the State of Indiana for its downtown revitalization project.  According to the Town of Fremont website, the plan included improvements for pedestrian traffic, new street lighting and signage options, and reverse angle parking along Toledo Street for two blocks between Tolford and Pleasant Streets.  Construction began in September 2011 and was finished roughly 90 days later.

See also
 "Life's Better Here" feature on Fremont, Indiana on June 8, 2011
 Photo of Fremont High School
 Map of Vistula Park

References
 Dodge, Dick "The Dodge Report", June 13, 2006, accessed August 18, 2008.
 Indiana Department of Natural Resources, "Underground Railroad Sites: Fremont", accessed August 24, 2009.
 McClew, Maurice (1956) "The Underground Railroad in Steuben County", Harvey Morley, editor, The 1955 History, Complete County Atlas, pictorial and Biographical Album of Steuben County, Indiana, Angola, Indiana, pp. 352–354.
 Sauer, Lee "Freedom Trail: The Underground Railroad ran through northeast Indiana, KPC News.net, accessed August 18, 2008.
 Taylor, Robert M.; Stevens, Errol Wayne; Ponder, Mary Ann (1990) Indiana: A New Historical Guide, Indiana Historical Society, .

External links
 Town of Fremont, Indiana website
 Fremont Chamber of Commerce
 Fremont Community Schools website
 Fremont Public Library
 Pokagon State Park

Towns in Steuben County, Indiana
Towns in Indiana
Populated places on the Underground Railroad